Selenanthias is a genus of fish in the family Serranidae native to the western and central Pacific Ocean.

Species
The World Register of Marine Species currently recognizes three species in this genus:

 Selenanthias analis Tanaka, 1918
 Selenanthias barroi (Fourmanoir, 1982)
 Selenanthias myersi Randall, 1995

References

Marine fish genera
Anthiinae